Stigmella luteella is a moth of the family Nepticulidae. It is found in all of Europe, except the Iberian Peninsula and the Balkan Peninsula.

The wingspan is 4–5 mm. Head pale yellowish to fuscous, collar whitish. Antennal eyecaps whitish. Forewings bronze-fuscous; a somewhat shining yellow-whitish fascia beyond middle, narrowed or sometimes obsolete on costa; apical area beyond this purple-fuscous. Hindwings grey.

Adults are on wing from May to July.

The larvae feed on Betula nana, Betula pendula and Betula pubescens. They mine the leaves of their host plant. The mine consists of a slender corridor. The first part consists of some close loops around the oviposition (egg laying) site. The later part is much less contorted, with a frass line that occupies one third to one half of the width of the gallery. Pupation takes place outside of the mine.

References

External links
Fauna Europaea
bladmineerders.nl
UKmoths
Swedish moths
Stigmella luteella images at  Consortium for the Barcode of Life
lepiforum.de

Nepticulidae
Moths of Europe
Taxa named by Henry Tibbats Stainton
Moths described in 1857